Blue Ridge Communications is a regional cable television, Internet and voice over IP provider that serves much of the Poconos area and central Pennsylvania in the United States. Products available include analog and digital cable television, HD television programming, PenTeleData Broadband Internet service, and Blue Ridge digital phone service.

References

Cable television companies of the United States
American companies established in 1950
Companies based in Carbon County, Pennsylvania
1950 establishments in Pennsylvania
Privately held companies based in Pennsylvania